The Hula Bowl is a post-season college football all-star game held annually, usually in January. From inception through the 2021 playing, it was held in Hawaii; since the 2022 edition, it has been played in Orlando, Florida.

The game was first staged in 1947, between mainland collegiate players and local Hawaiian players; it has been played exclusively with collegiate players since 1960. The bowl was paused following its 2008 edition, then was revived in January 2020.

The game was originally held at Honolulu Stadium in Honolulu, then moved to Aloha Stadium in Halawa starting with the January 1976 edition. The game remained at Aloha Stadium through the 2021 edition, except for eight editions played at War Memorial Stadium on the island of Maui. The University of Central Florida (UCF) agreed to host the January 2022 playing of the game, due to Aloha Stadium being closed for repairs and upgrades.

History

In late 1946, the first Hula Bowl was organized by Paul Stupin and Mackay Yanagisawa. When the inaugural game was played on January 5, 1947, the teams were composed of mainland college players (the "Southern California Rose Bowl Stars", led by UCLA quarterback Ernie Case) pitted against a local team of graduates of Leilehua (the "Leialums"), a local high school in Wahiawa, Hawaii—the mainland team won, 34–7. The teams played a two-game series every January until 1951, when the format was changed to allow National Football League  (NFL) players to join the Hawaiian all-stars, in an effort to create a more competitive environment. From 1960 onward, the game featured only collegiate players, and game results are listed in NCAA records. Players were historically rostered by college location; North vs. South or East vs. West. Since 2000, team names of Aina and Kai, the Hawaiian words for land and ocean, have been used multiple times.

The game was originally played in Honolulu Stadium in Honolulu through the January 1975 playing, then moved to Aloha Stadium in neighboring Halawa. In 1997, the then-mayor of Maui County, Linda Lingle, obtained authorization to spend $1.2 million to improve War Memorial Stadium in the town of Kahului on the island of Maui, which then hosted the game for the 1998 through 2005 playings. However, due to poor attendance and reduced revenue, the Hula Bowl returned to Oahu for its 2006 game and stayed at Aloha Stadium through the 2008 playing.

The game has predominantly been played in January as one of the final games of the college football postseason, allowing players who competed in bowl games with their collegiate teams to participate. The game has been held in early February twice, in 2002 and 2003.

For many years, the Hula Bowl was distinguished from a similar event, the Senior Bowl, by playing by collegiate rules rather than professional rules, and by remaining amateur (the Senior Bowl paid players through its 1988 edition). This was very important for those wishing to remain eligible to compete in other collegiate sports (such as college baseball) or otherwise retain amateur status. At one point the longest-running sporting event in Hawaii, it was considered a premier venue to launch professional careers in the NFL.

Changing direction

On July 1, 2006, it was announced that the American Football Coaches Association (AFCA) would end its ten-year relationship with the Hula Bowl due to "philosophical differences" over the future plans for the game, including proposed changes for the 2007 game — such as reintroducing the "Hawaiian Islands versus Mainland" matchup used from 1947 to 1959. University of Hawaii and former NFL head coach June Jones expressed a willingness to coach a potential Hawaiian Islands team, which would have a mix of Hawaiian and Polynesian players and, bowl organizers hoped, would draw more fans to the game. The Hula Bowl had also discussed the idea of allowing junior status players to participate in the game and bringing over college football players from Japan, something the game had done in the recent past. Game officials also discussed awarding a national "Hula Bowl Player of the Week" to college players during the regular season; the winning players would have been invited to play in the Hula Bowl and been able to direct a $1,000 donation to a charity in their state.

Dormancy
After the January 2008 playing, the bowl remained dormant. Organizers searched "for opportunities to reintroduce and reimagine the historic bowl game", and in November 2016, announced their intent to restart the game in North Carolina in January 2018. However, in March 2017, additional news reports indicated that a revival of the game was unlikely, as a key supporter of the proposal, North Carolina governor Pat McCrory, left office at the start of that year.

Revival
On October 29, 2019, it was announced that the Hula Bowl would be revived; the 2020 edition was played at Aloha Stadium on January 26, 2020. It featured "NCAA college football players from all divisions, along with international players". Aloha Stadium also hosted the 2021 edition, played on January 31, 2021, held without spectators after the facility was "deemed unsafe to hold crowds" in December 2020. In August 2021, with Aloha Stadium closed for repairs and upgrades, the University of Central Florida (UCF) agreed to host the 2022 playing—scheduled for January 15—at their home stadium, FBC Mortgage Stadium, in Orlando, Florida.

Game results

The Hula Bowl has used four different pairs of team designations. Before 2000, teams were rostered as either North vs. South or East vs. West, with the exception of the 1994 game, which was College Stars vs. Hawaii Ponoʻi ("Hawaii's own"). Since 2000, the matchup has been Aina vs. Kai, except for 2005 and 2006, which reverted to East vs. West. Past NCAA records have substituted North or West in place of Kai ("ocean"), and South or East in place of Aina ("land").

Venues
Honolulu Stadium (1960–1975)
Aloha Stadium (1976–1997, 2006–2008, 2020–2021)
War Memorial Stadium (Maui; 1998–2005)
FBC Mortgage Stadium (Orlando; 2022–present)

All-time series (updated through January 2023 game)
East leads West, 15–11–1
North leads South, 8–6
Kai and Aina are tied, 5–5–1
College Stars lead Hawaii Ponoʻi, 1–0

MVPs

1947–2008

2020–present

Coaches
Coaches for the first Hula Bowl played exclusively with college players, in January 1960, were Bud Wilkinson of Oklahoma and Paul Dietzel of LSU. Dietzel's East squad defeated Wilkinson's West team, 34–8. Multiple inductees of the College Football Hall of Fame have coached in the Hula Bowl, including: Bobby Bowden, Terry Donahue, Johnny Majors, Ara Parseghian, Bo Schembechler, and Barry Switzer. Larry Price coached in eight Hula Bowls (1969–1976) while Dick Tomey coached in seven Hula Bowls (1978–1979, 1981, 1983, 1985–1986, 1991); both while they were coaching with Hawaii. For coaches from the mainland, Lou Holtz has the most appearances, with five (1979, 1989–1990, 1993, 1997). These totals include both head coach and assistant coaching appearances.

Hall of fame
In 2019, the Hula Bowl announced the creation of a hall of fame. The hall's inductees are:

Head coach appearances in the Hula Bowl are listed in parentheses in the College column.

In popular culture
In 1997, a storyline in the comic strip Funky Winkerbean had Harry Dinkle and the Scapegoats marching band preparing to perform at the Hula Bowl.

See also
 Poi Bowl (1936–1939)
 Pineapple Bowl (1940–1941, 1947–1952)
 Aloha Bowl (1982–2000)
 Oahu Bowl (1998–2000)
 Hawaii Bowl (2002–present)
 List of college bowl games

References

External links
 

American football in Hawaii
College sports in Hawaii
College football all-star games
1947 establishments in Hawaii
2008 disestablishments in Hawaii
2020 establishments in Hawaii
Recurring sporting events established in 1947
Recurring sporting events disestablished in 2008
Recurring sporting events established in 2020